Maame Biney (born January 28, 2000) is an American short track speed skater who competed in the 2018 Winter Olympics in PyeongChang.

Early life
Biney was born in Accra, Ghana. At age five, she relocated to the United States to live with her father. Biney began skating when she was six years old in Northern Virginia. She began figure skating but switched to speed skating on a coach's recommendation.

Career
Biney won the bronze medal in the 500-meters at the 2017 World Junior Short Track Speed Skating Championships. She made her senior team debut later that year winning the America's Cup at the U.S Speedskating Short Track World Cup Qualifier. On December 16, 2017, Biney qualified for the 2018 Olympics by winning the 500-meters at the U.S. Olympic Trials, becoming the second African-born athlete to represent the U.S. at the Winter Olympics, after Madagascar-born biathlete Dan Westover in 1998.

In the 2018 Olympics, Biney did not make it past her qualifying heat in the 1500-meters and was ousted from the 500-meter race in the quarterfinals.

Coming back from the 2018 Olympics, Biney did well at the 2018 World Junior Short Track Speed Skating Championships, winning gold in the 500-meters, bronze in the 1000-meters, and bronze overall.

Biney qualified for the 2022 Winter Olympics at the 2022 US Olympic Team Trials - Short Track Speedskating.

References

2000 births
Living people
American female short track speed skaters
American sportspeople of Ghanaian descent
Four Continents Short Track Speed Skating Championships medalists
Olympic short track speed skaters of the United States
Short track speed skaters at the 2018 Winter Olympics
Short track speed skaters at the 2022 Winter Olympics
21st-century American women